Bogogno (Piedmontese: Boeugn, Lombard: Buögn) is a comune (municipality) in the Province of Novara in the Italian region of Piedmont, located about  northeast of Turin and about  northwest of Novara.

Bogogno borders the following municipalities: Agrate Conturbia, Borgomanero, Cressa, Gattico-Veruno and Suno.

References

External links
 Official website

Cities and towns in Piedmont